Angela Brito (born 5 April 1985) is an Ecuadorian long distance runner. She competed in the women's marathon at the 2017 World Championships in Athletics.

References

External links
 

1985 births
Living people
Ecuadorian female long-distance runners
Ecuadorian female marathon runners
World Athletics Championships athletes for Ecuador
Place of birth missing (living people)
21st-century Ecuadorian women